Several religious offices with seats in Winnipeg carry the title Bishop (or similar):

 the Anglican Bishop of the Diocese of Rupert's Land
 the Roman Catholic Archbishop of the Archdiocese of Winnipeg
 the Roman Catholic Archbishop of the Archdiocese of Saint Boniface
 the Ukrainian Catholic Archbishop of the Archeparchy of Winnipeg (who is the head of the church in Canada)
 the Ukrainian Orthodox Archbishop of Winnipeg and the Central Diocese (who is also Primate of the Ukrainian Orthodox Church of Canada)